Papyrus 85 (in the Gregory-Aland numbering), designated by 𝔓85, is an early copy of the New Testament in Greek. It is a papyrus manuscript of the Book of Revelation. The manuscript paleographically has been assigned to the 4th century (or the 5th century).

The surviving texts of Revelation are verses 9:19-10:2,5-9.

 Text 
The Greek text of this codex is a representative of the Alexandrian text-type. Aland placed it in Category II.

 Location 
It is currently housed at the Bibliothèque nationale et universitaire (P. Gr. 1028) in Strasbourg.

See also 

 List of New Testament papyri
 Papyrus 82

References

Further reading 

 J. Schwartz, Papyrus et tradition manuscrite, Zeitschrift für Papyrologie und Epigraphik 7 (Bonn: 1969), pp. 178–182.

New Testament papyri
4th-century biblical manuscripts
Book of Revelation papyri